Estrées-Mons is a commune in the Somme department in Hauts-de-France in northern France. The municipality was formed in 1973 from the merger of Estrées-en-Chaussée and Mons-en-Chaussée.

It is one of many villages in the north of France bearing the name Estrées. The etymology of the name is from strata (cognate of English "street"), the word for the stone-layered Roman roads in the area (some of which turned into modern highways). Hence Estreti, village on the road which developed into Estrées.

Geography

Population

See also
Communes of the Somme department

References

Communes of Somme (department)